"Bend and Break" is a song performed and composed by English rock band Keane, released as the fifth and final single from their debut album Hopes and Fears.

Track listing
"Bend and Break"
"On a Day Like Today"
"Allemande (Live)"
"Bend and Break" (live video)

Basto Re-mix (26 August 2013)
"Bend and Break" (Basto Re-Mix)

Chart performance

See also
List of songs by Keane

References

External links
Official website
Keaneshaped – Information about record

2005 singles
Keane (band) songs
Songs written by Tim Rice-Oxley
Songs written by Tom Chaplin
Songs written by Richard Hughes (musician)